Washington County is a county located in the Commonwealth of Virginia. As of the 2020 census, the population was 53,935. Its county seat is Abingdon.

Washington County is part of the Kingsport–Bristol–Bristol, TN-VA Metropolitan Statistical Area, which is a component of the Johnson City–Kingsport–Bristol, TN-VA Combined Statistical Area, commonly known as the "Tri-Cities" region.

History

For thousands of years, indigenous peoples of varying cultures lived in the area. At the time of European encounter, the Chiska had a chief village near what is now Saltville, destroyed by the Spaniards in 1568. The Cherokee annexed the region from the Xualae around 1671, and ceded it to the Virginia Colony in 1770 at the Treaty of Lochaber.

The county was formed by Virginians in 1776 from Fincastle County.  It was named for George Washington, who was then commander-in-chief of the Continental Army. Washington County is among the first geographical regions to be named after the president of the United States.

Washington County was raided by the Chickamauga Cherokee during the Cherokee–American wars. In July, 1776, Chief Dragging Canoe led an attack on Black's Fort (renamed Abingdon in 1778).  The area remained prone to attack until after Chickamauga leader Bob Benge was finally slain by settlers in Washington County in 1794.

As with many other frontier counties, the boundaries and territory changed over the years. In 1786 the northwestern part of Washington County became Russell County.  In 1814 the western part of what remained of Washington County was combined with parts of Lee and Russell counties to form Scott County.  In 1832 the northeastern part of Washington was combined with part of Wythe County to form Smyth County.  Finally, with the incorporation of the town of Goodson as the independent city of Bristol in 1890, Washington County assumed its present size.

Geography

Districts
The county is divided into seven magisterial districts: Harrison, Jefferson, Madison, Monroe, Taylor, Tyler, and Wilson.

Adjacent counties
 Smyth County - northeast
 Grayson County - east-southeast
 Johnson County, Tennessee - south
 Sullivan County, Tennessee - southwest
 Bristol (City) - southwest
 Scott County - west
 Russell County - northwest

National protected areas
 Jefferson National Forest (part)
 Mount Rogers National Recreation Area (part)

Major highways

Demographics

2020 census

Note: the US Census treats Hispanic/Latino as an ethnic category. This table excludes Latinos from the racial categories and assigns them to a separate category. Hispanics/Latinos can be of any race.

2000 Census
As of the census of 2000, there were 51,103 people, 21,056 households, and 14,949 families residing in the county.  The population density was 91 people per square mile (35/km2).  There were 22,985 housing units at an average density of 41 per square mile (16/km2).  The racial makeup of the county was 97.56% White, 1.32% Black or African American, 0.11% Native American, 0.27% Asian, 0.03% Pacific Islander, 0.14% from other races, and 0.58% from two or more races.  0.63% of the population were Hispanic or Latino of any race.

There were 21,056 households, out of which 28.10% had children under the age of 18 living with them, 59.10% were married couples living together, 8.70% had a female householder with no husband present, and 29.00% were non-families. 25.80% of all households were made up of individuals, and 10.40% had someone living alone who was 65 years of age or older.  The average household size was 2.36 and the average family size was 2.84.

In the county, the population was spread out, with 20.80% under the age of 18, 8.70% from 18 to 24, 28.30% from 25 to 44, 26.90% from 45 to 64, and 15.30% who were 65 years of age or older.  The median age was 40 years. For every 100 females, there were 94.20 males.  For every 100 females age 18 and over, there were 91.70 males.

The median income for a household in the county was $32,742, and the median income for a family was $40,162. Males had a median income of $30,104 versus $21,307 for females. The per capita income for the county was $18,350.  About 8.10% of families and 10.90% of the population were below the poverty line, including 13.20% of those under age 18 and 14.20% of those age 65 or over.

Education

Colleges
 Emory and Henry College, Emory
 Virginia Highlands Community College, Abingdon
 Virginia Intermont College, Bristol (closed 2014) ** Portion ** The main VIC campus was located in the City of Bristol, however the Equestrian Center (now part of Emory & Henry College) is located in Washington County.

Public high schools
 Abingdon High School, Abingdon
 Holston High School, Damascus
 John S. Battle High School, Bristol
 Patrick Henry High School, Glade Spring

Communities

Towns

 Abingdon
 Damascus
 Glade Spring
 Saltville

Census-designated places
 Emory
 Meadowview

Other unincorporated communities
 Azen
 Goose Pimple Junction
 Green Spring
 Hayter
 Konnarock
 Mendota
 Plasterco
 Taylor's Valley

Several unincorporated portions of the county have Bristol addresses.

Notable people
 Frederick C. Boucher, Member of Congress
 Red Byron, race car driver
 David Campbell, Governor of Virginia
 John Buchanan Floyd, Governor of Virginia, U.S. Secretary of War and C.S.A. general
 Robert William Hughes, lawyer, newspaper publisher, U.S. District Court judge
 John Warfield Johnston, lawyer, judge, U.S. Senator
 Barbara Kingsolver, writer and novelist
 Joseph Meek, American frontiersman
 William Frank Newton, jazz musician
 John E. Reinhardt, Ambassador to Nigeria, Director of the U.S. Information Agency and Assistant Secretary of State for Public Affairs
 Wyndham Robertson, Governor of Virginia 
 Connally Findlay Trigg. Member of Congress
 Hiram Emory Widener, Jr., U.S. District Court and U.S. Court of Appeals judge

Politics

See also
 National Register of Historic Places listings in Washington County, Virginia

References

External links
 Washington County government official website
 Washington County Virginia Public Schools
 Washington County Virginia Chamber of Commerce
 Washington County Virginia GIS (Geographic Information Systems)
 Mount Rogers Planning District
 Barter Theater (State Theater of Virginia)

 
Virginia counties
1776 establishments in Virginia
Kingsport–Bristol metropolitan area
Populated places established in 1776
Counties of Appalachia